Birlanagar Junction railway station is a small railway junction in Gwalior city, Madhya Pradesh. Its code is BLNR. It serves Gwalior city. The station consists of three platforms. The platforms are not well sheltered. It lacks many facilities including water and sanitation.

Major trains 

 Gwalior–Bhind Passenger (unreserved)
 Agra–Jhansi Passenger (unreserved)
 Agra–Gwalior Fast Passenger (unreserved)
 Kota–Bhind Passenger
 Gwalior–Agra Fast Passenger (unreserved)

References

Railway junction stations in Madhya Pradesh
Railway stations in Gwalior
Jhansi railway division